The 2009–10 season of the Belgian Second Division (also known as EXQI League for sponsorship reasons) started on Wednesday 19 August and is the second tier football league in Belgium. The league was played by 19 teams, with 36 matchdays, so each team plays the 18 other teams twice. The season was divided into 2 periods. Each period winner qualifies for the Belgian Second Division Final Round.

Team changes
After promotion and relegation, only 13 teams remained in the league, with 6 other being replaced:

In
 R.A.E.C. Mons relegated from the First Division
 F.C. Tubize relegated from the First Division
 Dender lost the second division final round and as a result they were also relegated from the First Division.
 Standaard Wetteren promoted from Third Division A
 Turnhout promoted from Third Division B
 Boussu Dour Borinage promoted after winning the third division playoffs

Out
 Sint-Truidense was promoted to the Pro League
 Olympic Charleroi lost the third division playoffs and was subsequently relegated.
 Excelsior Virton lost the third division playoffs and was subsequently relegated.
 K.F.C. V.W. Hamme lost the third division playoffs and was subsequently relegated.
 K.M.S.K. Deinze was relegated to the Third Division.
 UR Namur was relegated to the Third Division.

Team information

Personnel and locations

Regular season

League table

References

Belgian Second Division seasons
2009–10 in Belgian football
Belgian